Pre-revolutionary Iranian cinema contains films and cinematic events made in Iran before Iranian revolution era. Hooshang Kavoosi, an Iranian film critic first used term Filmfarsi to point to Iranian popular films before revolution.

History

The 1960s was a significant decade for Iranian cinema, with 25 commercial films produced annually on average throughout the early ‘60s, increasing to 65 by the end of the decade. The majority of production focused on melodrama and thrillers.
From 1937 till 1947 because of the world economic conditions and then the involvement in World War Two, the motion picture industry in Iran did not produce a single film, but the flow of foreign film to Iran did not stop. In 1947, Esmail Koushan, with the help of some of his colleagues, established Mitra Films (1997), the first real film company in Tehran. Through their persistence, local feature film production was born and survived.
The movie that really boost the economy of Iranian cinema and initiated a new genre was Ganj-e Qarun (Croesus Treasure), made in 1965 by Siamak Yasemi. Three years later Davoud Mollapour directed Shohare Ahoo Khanoom (Madam Ahou's Husband), which revolutionized Iranian Cinema by portraying women's role in the Iranian society at that time. It also showed actresses (Mehri Vadadian and Adile Eshragh) to be the heroes on big screen for the first time. In 1969, Masoud Kimiai made Kaiser. With Kaiser (Qeysar), Kimiai depicted the ethics and morals of the romanticized poor working class of the Ganj-e-Qarun genre through his main protagonist, the titular Qeysar. But Kimiay's film generated another genre in Iranian popular cinema: the tragic action drama.

With the screening of the films Shohare Ahoo Khanoom directed by Davoud Mollapour in 1968, and Kaiser and The Cow, directed by Masoud Kimiai and Darius Mehrjui respectively in 1969, alternative film established their status in the film industry. By 1970 Iranian cinema entered into its mature stage. The College of Dramatic Arts, instituted in 1963, produced its first graduates at the decade's beginning. Many progressive film co-ops and associations came into existence and there were a few regular film festivals taking place in the country. Attempts to organize a film festival that had begun in 1954 within the framework of the Golrizan Festival, bore fruits in the form of the Sepas Film Festival in 1969. The first Iranian film festival was held in 1970 with Kaiser, The Cow, and Shohare Ahoo Khanoom winning the first, second and third prize for the best pictures respectively. The endeavors of Ali Mortazavi also resulted in the formation of the Tehran International Film Festival in 1973.
From 1950 to the mid-1960 the Iranian film industry grew rapidly. Many studios were established as well as others that entered the Cycle of the film industry independently. There were 324 films produced during this period 1950 for 1965. By 1965 there were 72 movie theatres in Tehran and 192 in other Provinces. Ebrahim Golestan in 1965 directed by films of interest Brick and Mirror 1965. Bahram Beyzai is the director of one of the ground-breaking films of the Iranian New wave, 1972 Ragbar (Downpour). Sohrab Shahid-Saless is auteur director who embodied his original style in his 1975 film Still Life. Abbas Kiarostami is now a well-known director of the 1990s who directed one of the last films that screened before the revolution in 1978, Gozaresh (The Report).

Notable directors

 Amin Amini
 Abdolhossein Sepanta
 Esmail Koushan
 Masoud Kimiay
 Darius Mehrjui
 Ebrahim Golestan
 Bahram Beyzai
 Sohrab Shahid-Saless
 Parviz Kimiavi
 Amir Naderi
 Forough Farrokhzad
 Nasser Taghvai
 Ali Hatami

Notable actors

 Amin Amini
 Behrouz Vossoughi
 Mohammad Ali Fardin
 Naser Malek Motiei
 Googoosh
 Forouzan
 Susan Taslimi
 Hamideh Kheirabadi
 Shahla Riahi
 Bahman Mofid
 Pouri Banayi
 Iraj Ghaderi
 Irene Zazians
 Saeed Kangarani
 Fariba Khatami
 Morteza Aghili
 Jamshid Mashayekhi
 Ezzatollah Entezami
 Ali Nasirian
 Davood Rashidi
 Mohammad-Ali Keshavarz

Notable films

 Bot
 Noghre Dagh
 Koocheh Marda
 The Cow
 Qeysar
 The House is Black
 Caravans
 The Traveller
 Dar Emtedade Shab
 The Beehive
 Lor Girl
 Subah-O-Shaam
 Leyli and Majnun
 The Deers
 The Chess Game of the Wind
 Ganj-e Qarun
 Ballad of Tara
 Sooteh-Delan

See also 

 Cinema of Iran
 Iranian New Wave
 Persian Film

References

Cinema of Iran
Cultural history of Iran